Johannes Nevala, born 1966 in Finland, is an artist who paints birds, especially on the seashore where he captures the birds in oil, watercolors and different graphic techniques. His art is inspired by the Nordic light and the artists von Wright, Bruno Liljefors, Gunnar Brusewitz and Lars Jonsson, who specialised in nature and birds.

Nevala has had several exhibitions since 1993, including in New York City, Stowe, Palm Beach, London, and Holland.
On several occasions his art was included in the ”Birds in Art” exhibition arranged by Leigh Yawkey Woodson Art Museum in Wausau, Wisconsin.

External links
Nevala.se

References 

 https://web.archive.org/web/20070607113212/http://www.birdsinpaintings.com/
 http://www.mallgalleries.org.uk/
 https://web.archive.org/web/20070914110342/http://www.kunsthuisvanhetoosten.nl/
 http://www.lywam.org

1966 births
20th-century Swedish painters
Swedish male painters
21st-century Swedish painters
Bird artists
Living people
20th-century Swedish male artists
21st-century Swedish male artists